Daniele Ragatzu (born 21 September 1991) is an Italian professional footballer who plays as a striker for  club Olbia.

Club career

Cagliari 
A Sardinian native, Ragatzu was a youth product of Cagliari Calcio. He made his first senior appearance in Serie A on 1 March 2009 against Torino; on 10 April he scored his first Serie A goal against Fiorentina. In the 2009–10 season Ragatzu scored 2 goals in Serie A, one against Milan on 3 April 2010.

Verona
On 8 January 2013, Ragatzu was signed by Verona in a -year contract. In the same transfer window he left for Pro Vercelli.

Verona won promotion to Serie A in 2013 as the runner-up of the second level. Ragatzu was awarded no.32 shirt for Verona in 2013–14 Serie A season.

However, on 20 January 2014 Ragatzu left for Serie B club Lanciano in a temporary deal.

Pro Vercelli
In summer 2014 Ragatzu was transferred to Pro Vercelli.

Ragatzu picked no.23 shirt for Pro Vercelli in 2014–15 Serie B.

Rimini
On 17 July 2015, Ragatzu and Pro Vercelli agreed to terminate the player contract between the two parties. Ragatzu was signed by Rimini in the same transfer window. Ragatzu had an operation on his left leg on 1 February 2016.

At the end of season Rimini was expelled from professional league due to financial difficulties.

Olbia
Ragatzu joined Lega Pro newcomer Olbia on 16 July 2016.

Return to Cagliari
On 29 January 2018, he signed a contract with Cagliari until 2021, who immediately loaned him back to Olbia until 30 June 2019.

Return to Olbia
He returned to Olbia on 10 November 2020 until the end of the 2020–21 season. On 14 May 2021, he extended his contract for the 2021–22 season.

References

External links
 
 Daniele Ragatzu National Team Stats at FIGC.it  

1991 births
Living people
Sportspeople from Cagliari
Footballers from Sardinia
Italian footballers
Association football forwards
Serie A players
Serie B players
Serie C players
Cagliari Calcio players
A.S. Gubbio 1910 players
Hellas Verona F.C. players
F.C. Pro Vercelli 1892 players
S.S. Virtus Lanciano 1924 players
Rimini F.C. 1912 players
Olbia Calcio 1905 players
Italy youth international footballers